Morakotiella is a genus of fungi in the family Halosphaeriaceae. This is a monotypic genus, containing the single species Morakotiella salina, first described in 1986 as Haligena salina.

References

Microascales
Monotypic Sordariomycetes genera